The Dayton District is a railroad line owned and operated by the Norfolk Southern Railway in the U.S. state of Ohio. The line runs from Columbus southwest to Cincinnati along former Pennsylvania Railroad and New York Central Railroad lines. Its east end is at or near the Columbus District, Sandusky District, and West Virginia Secondary; its south end is in Ivorydale, where it meets the Indiana and Ohio Railway's Midland Subdivision, and just past that in Winton Place, where it meets CSX Transportation's Cincinnati Terminal Subdivision. Along the way, it junctions the New Castle District at Evendale.

History
The oldest part of the line is from Columbus west to London, was opened in 1850 by the Columbus and Xenia Railroad. In 1851, the Springfield and Dayton Railroad opened from Springfield southwest to Dayton. The Springfield and Columbus Railroad opened in 1853 from London west to Springfield. The Cincinnati and Springfield Railway opened the final piece, between Dayton and Bond Hill (part of Cincinnati), in 1872. The Columbus and Xenia Railroad became part of the Pennsylvania Railroad system, while the rest became New York Central Railroad lines. The two companies merged to form Penn Central Transportation in 1968 and were taken over by Conrail in 1976. What was then known as the Cincinnati Line was assigned to Norfolk Southern in the 1999 breakup of Conrail.

References

Norfolk Southern Railway lines
Pittsburgh, Cincinnati, Chicago and St. Louis Railroad lines
Cleveland, Cincinnati, Chicago and St. Louis Railway lines
Rail infrastructure in Ohio